King Zhuang of Chu (reigned 613-591 BC) was a monarch of the Zhou dynasty State of Chu during the Spring and Autumn period in ancient China. His personal name was Xiong Lü, his ancestral name was Mi, and his posthumous title was King Zhuang. He was one of the five rulers dubbed the Five Hegemons by Xunzi and attempted to wrest control of China from King Ding of Zhou.

The son of King Mu of Chu, Zhuang ascended the throne in 613 BC. According to a legend in the Records of the Grand Historian, for the first three years of his reign Zhuang wasted time in pleasure seeking, but, when challenged by two courtiers, reformed his ways.

The king made Sunshu Ao his chancellor. Sunshu Ao began a series of major dam-works and an enormous planned reservoir in modern-day northern Anhui province. 

After some military successes, King Zhuang attempted to usurp King Ding of Zhou. According to a well-known story, probably an invention of the Warring States period, he asked a messenger from Zhou about the weight of the legendary Nine Tripod Cauldrons which Zhou possessed, a euphemism for seeking ultimate power in China, but was rebuffed. This incident gave rise to the chengyu "to enquire about ding in the central plains", i.e. to have great ambitions.

In the Battle of Bi, his army defeated the State of Jin. His progress from lazy regent to hegemon gave rise to the Chinese chengyu "amaze [others] with one cry".

References

591 BC deaths
Chinese kings
Monarchs of Chu (state)
6th-century BC Chinese monarchs
7th-century BC Chinese monarchs
Year of birth unknown